Federico Granja Ricalde (17 August 1942 – 2 November 2021) was a Mexican politician. A member of the Institutional Revolutionary Party, he served in the Chamber of Deputies from 1979 to 1982, 1985 to 1988, and again from 2000 to 2003. He was also Governor of Yucatán from 1994 to 1995 and Municipal President of Mérida from 1976 to 1978.

References

1942 births
2021 deaths
Governors of Yucatán (state)
Members of the Chamber of Deputies (Mexico)
Institutional Revolutionary Party politicians
People from Mérida, Yucatán
20th-century Mexican politicians
21st-century Mexican politicians
Municipal presidents of Mérida
Politicians from Yucatán (state)
Deputies of the LVIII Legislature of Mexico